Trallpunk (Swedish; roughly translates to 'melodious punk' — see the Wiktionary entry) is a subgenre of punk music developed in Sweden.  It is known for its fast drums, a melodic sound, and often politically oriented lyrics. Generally, Asta Kask is considered to be one of the first trallpunk bands. During the 1990s, trallpunk saw increased popularity, particularly due to the club Kafé 44 in Stockholm and the band De Lyckliga Kompisarna (The Happy Friends).

Today, trallpunk is represented through bands such as Varnagel, Slutstation Tjernobyl, Greta Kassler, and De Lyckliga Kompisarna. Internationally, bands like Rasta Knast and Takahashi Gumi are examples.

Trallpunk bands 
Some trallpunk bands include:

 Asta Kask
 Charta 77
 De Lyckliga Kompisarna
 Dia Psalma
 Gymnastiken
 Köttgrottorna
 Krymplings
 Lastkaj 14
 M.I.D.
 Mimikry
 Ohlson har semester production
 Radioaktiva Räker
 Rasta Knast
 Räserbajs
 Senap
 Skumdum
 Slutstation Tjernobyl
 Strebers
 Troublemakers
 Varnagel
 Hans & Greta
 Coca Carola
 Sten & Stalin
 Finkel Rokkers
 Epa
 Körbärsfettera
 The Retards
 Die Zlaskhinx (Finland)
 Granit & the no one elses
 Sighstens Grannar
 Dr. Anti Skval
 Sällskapsresan
 Björnarna
 Sardo Numspa
 Hiroshima
 Grötkäft
 Otajt
 Vintertid
 Tralltrollen
 Tarmgas
 Punktering
 4zugarna (Japan)
 Trallskruv
 Argentina

References

Punk rock genres